Better Late Than Never is a 1979 American TV film. It was written by John Carpenter and directed by Richard Crenna.

Cast
Harold Gould as Harry Landers
Strother Martin as J D Ashcroft
Tyne Daly as Ms Davis
Harry Morgan as Mr Scott
Marjorie Bennett as Marjorie Crane
Victor Buono as Dr Zoltan Polos
George Gobel as Captain Taylor
Jeanette Nolan as Lavinia Leventhal
Donald Pleasence as Colonel Riddle
Larry Storch as Sheriff
Tom Spratley as Tom
Lou Jacobi as Milton Cohen
Paula Trueman as Alke Elam

References

External links

1979 films
1979 television films
1979 comedy-drama films
1970s English-language films
American comedy-drama television films
Films about old age
NBC network original films
Films scored by Charles Fox
1970s American films